The following is a list of current National Collegiate Athletic Association (NCAA) Division I Football Championship Subdivision (formerly Division I-AA) football stadiums in the United States.

Conference affiliations reflect those for the coming 2022 season.

Current stadiums

Notes

There are 6 domes, all of which have installed FieldTurf.

See also
Map of NCAA Division I FCS football stadiums
List of NCAA Division I FCS football programs
List of NCAA Division I FBS football stadiums
List of American football stadiums by capacity

References

External links
NCAA Sports Sponsorship - FCS

NCAA Division I FCS
College football-related lists
Division I FCS
Stadiums
Stadiums
Football